Vélez is a town and municipality of the Santander Department in northeastern Colombia.

References

Municipalities of Santander Department